Plasmopara pygmaea is a plant pathogen infecting anemones.

References

External links

Water mould plant pathogens and diseases
Ornamental plant pathogens and diseases
Peronosporales
Species described in 1886